Kolisch is the surname of the following people:

 Baron Ignác (Ignatz von) Kolisch (1837 in Pozsony – 1889), Hungarian chess player
 Rudolf Kolisch (1896–1978), musician, founder of the Kolisch Quartet

Germanic-language surnames
Jewish surnames